Calibanus is a subgenus  of sea snails, cone snails, marine gastropod mollusks in the genus Conus,  family Conidae, the cone snails and their allies.

In the new classification of the family Conidae by Puillandre N., Duda T.F., Meyer C., Olivera B.M. & Bouchet P. (2015), Calibanus  has become a subgenus of Conus: Conus (Calibanus ) da Motta, 1991 represented as Conus Thiele, 1929

Distinguishing characteristics
The Tucker & Tenorio 2009 taxonomy distinguishes Calibanus from Conus in the following ways:

 Genus Conus sensu stricto Linnaeus, 1758
 Shell characters (living and fossil species)
The basic shell shape is conical to elongated conical, has a deep anal notch on the shoulder, a smooth periostracum and a small operculum. The shoulder of the shell is usually nodulose and the protoconch is usually multispiral. Markings often include the presence of tents except for black or white color variants, with the absence of spiral lines of minute tents and textile bars.
Radular tooth (not known for fossil species)
The radula has an elongated anterior section with serrations and a large exposed terminating cusp, a non-obvious waist, blade is either small or absent and has a short barb, and lacks a basal spur.
Geographical distribution
These species are found in the Indo-Pacific region.
Feeding habits
These species eat other gastropods including cones.

 Subgenus Calibanus da Motta, 1991
Shell characters (living and fossil species)
The protoconch is paucispiral, and the shell is turbinate in shape.  The anal notch is moderate to deep.  The anterior end of the shell is darkened, and may be brown or purple.  Tent markings on the shell are poorly developed or may be absent, spiral lines of minute tents are absent, and textile bars are absent.  The periostracum is smooth, and the operculum is small.
Radular tooth (not known for fossil species)
The anterior section of the radula is much longer than posterior section, and the waist is not obvious. A basal spur is absent, the barb and blade are short.  Serrations and a terminating cusp on the radular tooth are present.
Geographical distribution
The one species in this genus occurs in the Indo-Pacific region..
Feeding habits
The one species in this genus is molluscivorous (meaning that it preys upon molluscs).  It is reported to prey on other cone species, most frequently Phasmoconus radiatus (Gmelin, 1791).

Species list
This list of species is based on the information in the World Register of Marine Species (WoRMS) list. Species within the genus Calibanus include:

The following species names are recognized as "alternate representations" (see full explanation below) in contrast to the traditional system, which uses the genus Conus for all species in the family:
 Calibanus furvus (Reeve, 1843): synonym of Conus (Calibanus) furvus Reeve, 1843 represented as Conus furvus Reeve, 1843
 Conus (Calibanus) thalassiarchus G. B. Sowerby I, 1834 represented as Conus thalassiarchus G. B. Sowerby I, 1834

References

Further reading 
 Kohn A. A. (1992). Chronological Taxonomy of Conus, 1758-1840". Smithsonian Institution Press, Washington and London.
 Monteiro A. (ed.) (2007). The Cone Collector 1: 1-28.
 Berschauer D. (2010). Technology and the Fall of the Mono-Generic Family The Cone Collector 15: pp. 51-54
 Puillandre N., Meyer C.P., Bouchet P., and Olivera B.M. (2011), Genetic divergence and geographical variation in the deep-water Conus orbignyi complex (Mollusca: Conoidea)'', Zoologica Scripta 40(4) 350-363.

External links
 To World Register of Marine Species
  Gastropods.com: Conidae setting forth the genera recognized therein.

Conidae